Rising Kashmir is a daily English newspaper printed and published in Srinagar, the summer capital of the Indian state of Jammu and Kashmir.

It was founded by Shujaat Bukhari in March 2008.

The newspaper has nurtured scores of reporters based in Kashmir, who now work in top news organisations around the world. It is one of the largest circulated dailies in Jammu and Kashmir. In November 2022, Five Journalists of Rising Kashmir resigned after Terrorist Threat.

References

External links
 Digital edition of Rising Kashmir

English-language newspapers published in India
Mass media in Jammu and Kashmir